Sir John Ralph Starkey, 1st Baronet (1 May 1859 – 13 November 1940) was a British Conservative Party politician.

Life
He was elected as member of parliament (MP) for Newark at the 1906 general election, and held the seat until he retired from the House of Commons at the 1922 general election.

In 1910, his gardener planted the first commercial orchard of Bramley apples at Starkey's Norwood Park estate. It was still in cultivation by the family in 2017.

Starkey was appointed a deputy lieutenant of Nottinghamshire in 1906, and was made a baronet in July 1935, of Norwood Park in the parish of Southwell and County of Nottingham.

He died in 1940.

References

External links 

1859 births
1940 deaths
Baronets in the Baronetage of the United Kingdom
Conservative Party (UK) MPs for English constituencies
Deputy Lieutenants of Nottinghamshire
UK MPs 1906–1910
UK MPs 1910
UK MPs 1910–1918
UK MPs 1918–1922